The 59th Mixed Brigade was a unit of the Spanish Republican Army created during the Spanish Civil War. It came to operate on the Teruel and Ebro fronts.

History

First phase 
The unit was created in January 1937, on the Teruel front, from the militarization of the Rosal Column; it was integrated into the 42nd Division of the 13th Army Corps. Command of the new brigade fell to the major militia José Neira Jarabo, with the anarchist Sigfrido Canut Martorell as political commissar.

Deployed in the Montes Universales sector, in July 1937 it took part in the Battle of Albarracín. Later, the 59th MB was deployed north of Teruel, covering the northern flank of the Republican front in Santa Bárbara de Celadas. The Battle of Alfambra began with an attack by nationalist forces on February 5, 1938, forcing the brigade's withdrawal from the entire front they defended. The enemy attack caused a break in the unit, which suffered heavy casualties. Two days later, on February 7, the remnants of the brigade managed to concentrate in Peralejos, withdrawing over the Alfambra river and dissolving the brigade.

Second phase 
In late 1938 the 59th Mixed Brigade was recreated again within the 42nd Division, from Marine Corps forces.

On the night of July 25-26, the unit concentrated to the east of the town of Móra la Nova. The next day the brigade crossed the Ebro through the Ribarroja-Fayón sector, reaching the line that ran from Els Auts, the road junction from Maella to Fraga and the mouth of the Matarraña river. However, on August 6 it had to abandon the so-called "Fayón-Mequinenza pocket" and return to the other shore. Compared to the other brigades of the division (226th and 227th), the 59th MB was the one that had suffered the least amount of attrition. After undergoing a reorganization, around September 14 it returned to the front line and relieved troops from the 3rd Division in the Sierra de Cavalls. Between October 8 and 20 it faced sustained enemy assaults, having to abandon its positions; after the front was broken, on November 5, the 59th MB lost the town of Miravet and two days later it had to withdraw from Móra d'Ebre. Finally, on November 12, it would cross the river again.

After the beginning of the Aragon Offensive, the brigade was sent to the Sierra de la Llena sector to try to stop the advance of the nationalists. Shortly after, it would be assigned to the reserve of the 15th Army Corps, but it would not take long for it to be involved again in the fighting in the Battle of the Segre. During the remainder of the campaign, the 59th BM would continue to retreat north, towards the French border, which it would cross on February 9 at the post of Portbou.

Command 
Commanders
 José Neira Jarabo;
 Eduardo García

Commissars
 Sigfrido Canut Martorell

See also 
 Mixed Brigades
 Rosal Column

Notes

References

Bibliography 

Military units and formations established in 1937
Military units and formations disestablished in 1939
Mixed Brigades (Spain)
Militarized anarchist formations